Thiruppudaimarudhur is a temple situated near Veeravanallur in Tirunelveli District, Tamil Nadu, India.

Description

Thiruppudaimarudur is unique because of its history. The JyothirLinga in Shrisailam, AP is considered as head of Shiva. The temple in ThiruvudaiMaruthur (idai in Tamil means middle) is considered as the body and ThiruppudaiMarudhur as the foot. If one could see the Shiva in ThiruppudaiMarudhur, one would get the benefit of visiting Shrisailam and ThiruvidaiMarudhur. Only these three temples have the Marudhu tree as sthalavriksha. Also Brahmadhand can be seen inside the temple.

History

There was a king called Surendra who killed another king in a battle. He was affected by the sin and wanted to get rid of it. He meditated Shiva. Shiva gave him a Brahmadhand and told that this will go to sea and get back to land, wherever it stops you build a temple. He built the temple. Also the Lord asked him to travel to Himalayas to search for a statue of Gomathi Maa. He did search and found which was completely made of Rudraksha. With that, he completed building the temple. He bathed in Thamirabharani river near the temple and got salvation. This is called "Surendara Moksha Theertham". It is believed that if one takes bath there, all sorts of sins are dissolved including "Brahmahathi dhosha".

During the Tamil month of Thai (15 January to 15 February) the Theerthavaari Festival is celebrated in Thaipoosam.

Nearby places of interest

There is hospital called Mayopathy in the nearby city of Veeravanallur nearby, which treats diseases that cannot be cured by modern medicine.

Other places of interest include Navathiruppadhi and NavaKailasam.

There are dams - Manimuthar, Karaiyar - lower and upper dams.

Other natural features include falls, such as Agasthiyar, Kutralam, and Paanatheertham and hills- Papanasam, Maanjolai, Kodhaiyar, Agasthiyar hill.

Also Kalakkadu tiger reservoir is nearby. This village has a conservation reserve planned.

See also
 Mannarkovil, an ancient temple town
 Brahmadesam, an ancient temple town
 Ambasamudram, an ancient temple town
 Veeravanallur, an ancient temple town

References

Hindu temples in Tirunelveli district
Shiva temples in Tirunelveli district